, known as the  for sponsorship reasons, is an indoor sporting arena located in Minato-ku, Osaka City, Osaka Prefecture, Japan. The arena opened on 1996.

This arena was built in Yahataya Park in the Osaka Bay area. The arena is all underground and the roof is covered with planting.

History 
 June 1993 - Start to construction.
 April 1996 - Finish to construction.

Uses 
The arena hosted several matches for the Women's Volleyball World Championship for its 1998, 2006, and 2010 editions.

B.League team Osaka Evessa (basketball team) basically holds home games at the Ookini Arena Maishima, but Osaka Evessa may also hold home games at the Osaka Municipal Central Gymnasium.

F.League team Shriker Osaka (futsal team) basically holds home games at the Osaka Municipal Central Gymnasium.

Facilities 
 Main Arena
 Floor size - 46 m × 77 m (3,580 m2)
 Height - 19 m
 Full arena - 16,000 people
 Capacity - 10,000 people
 Fixed seats - 5,932 seats
 Movable seats - 1,390 seats

 Sub Arena
 Pitch size - 35 m × 38 m (1,540 m2)
 Height - 12.5 m
 Fixed seats - 188 seats

Access 
 3 minute walk from Osaka MetroChūō LineAsashiobashi Station

See also 
 Osaka Pool

References

External links 
  
 Nikken Sekkei - Projects: Osaka Municipal Central Gymnasium

Basketball venues in Japan
Boxing venues in Japan
Indoor arenas in Japan
Osaka Evessa
Sports venues in Osaka
Volleyball venues in Japan
Judo venues
Badminton venues